Joacim Eriksson (born April 9, 1990) is a Swedish professional ice hockey goaltender currently playing with Schwenninger Wild Wings of the Deutsche Eishockey Liga (DEL). Eriksson played several years in the Swedish junior leagues, making his professional debut in 2008. He was subsequently drafted by the Philadelphia Flyers in the 2008 NHL Entry Draft, though never signed with the team. In 2013 Eriksson signed with the Vancouver Canucks, and joined their minor league affiliate in the American Hockey League. He appeared in one game for the Canucks in 2014, and returned to Sweden after two years in North America. Internationally Eriksson played for Sweden at both the under-18 and senior level, winning a gold medal at the 2007 Ivan Hlinka Memorial Tournament and a bronze at the 2014 World Championships.

Playing career
Eriksson started his junior career in Valbo before he moved onto the more prestigious Brynäs IF in his hometown of Gävle in 2007. He was born and raised in the village Hedesunda, where he played his first game as a child.  He was drafted in the 7th round of the 2008 NHL Entry Draft at 196th overall by the Philadelphia Flyers. However the Flyers did not sign him by June 1, 2011, they lost the rights to him.

Unable to find significant playing time behind Jacob Markström after two years of juniors play and after setting league high marks for Brynäs' J20 SuperElit team, Eriksson moved west to Leksands IF of the second-tier Allsvenskan.  The move paid off, as Eriksson played in 38 games in the 2009–10 season with a 2.40 goals against average and a .926 save percentage.  This led Leksand to play in the Kvalserien for promotion to the Elitserien for the 2010–11 season.

From 2010 to 2013, Eriksson played for SHL side Skellefteå AIK. He won the Swedish championship with the club in 2013 and reached the SHL finals in 2011 and 2012.

On June 15, 2013, Eriksson signed a two-year professional contract with the Vancouver Canucks. Eriksson played in his first career NHL regular season game for the Canucks on January 15, 2014 against the Anaheim Ducks, coming in relief of starter Eddie Läck in a 9–1 loss. He mostly saw action for the Canucks' affiliate, the Utica Comets, in the American Hockey League.

On June 23, 2015, Eriksson agreed to terms with Dinamo Riga of the KHL. He made 34 appearances for Riga with a GAA of 2.42 and a SVS% of .919. After a single season in Latvia with Riga, he penned a deal with the Växjö Lakers of the Swedish Hockey League in April 2016.

International play

Eriksson's first big international exposure came at the 2007 Ivan Hlinka Memorial Tournament where he helped Sweden win its first and only gold medal in the tournament.

Eriksson was named to the 2008 IIHF World U18 Championships, playing for  Sweden.  He dressed for every game in the tournament, but did not play behind Jacob Markström, as Sweden finished fourth.

He won bronze at the 2014 World Championships with the Swedish national team, making eight appearances during the tournament.

Career statistics

Regular season and playoffs

International

Awards
 2007–08 J20 SuperElit SM-silver Medal
 2007–08 U18 World Cup Ivan Hlinka Memorial Tournament Champion
 2008–09 Best GAA in the J20 SuperElit regular season with 1.99
 2008–09 Best save percentage in the J20 SuperElit regular season with .930
 2008–09 Best GAA in the J20 SuperElit playoffs with 1.83
 2008–09 Best save percentage in the J20 SuperElit playoffs with .938
 2008–09 J20 SuperElit Champion
 2012–13 SHL Champion
 2014 Bronze medal World Championships

References

External links 

 

1990 births
Almtuna IS players
Brynäs IF players
Dinamo Riga players
Djurgårdens IF Hockey players
Leksands IF players
Living people
People from Gävle
Philadelphia Flyers draft picks
Schwenninger Wild Wings players
Skellefteå AIK players
Swedish ice hockey goaltenders
Utica Comets players
Vancouver Canucks players
Växjö Lakers players
Sportspeople from Gävleborg County